Xipaya (or Shipaja or Xipaia) is an endangered language spoken in the Pará region of Brazil. 

It is one of the approximately 70 Tupian languages of South America. At last count, Xipaya was only spoken by two elderly women in Altamira, Pará.

Phonology

References

External links 

 ELAR archive of Documentation of Urgently Endangered Tupian Languages (including Xipaya)

Tupian languages
Endangered Tupian languages